Jarkko Luiro (born 22 March 1998) is a Finnish professional footballer who plays for RoPS, as a striker.

References

1998 births
Living people
Finnish footballers
FC Santa Claus players
Rovaniemen Palloseura players
Veikkausliiga players
Kakkonen players
Association football forwards